The St. Francis Terriers men's soccer team represented St. Francis College, which is located in Brooklyn Heights, New York. The team was a member of the Division I Northeast Conference (NEC). The Terriers played their home games at Brooklyn Bridge Park on Pier 5, which is also located in Brooklyn Heights. The field is located on the East River and has the Manhattan Skyline as a backdrop.
 

From 1968 to 2019, the Terriers have compiled a 455–365–88 record and have won five NEC regular season championships and eight NEC tournament championships. Since joining the NEC in 1985, the Terriers have compiled a 137–117–26 record in conference play and have won the most tournament championships in the conference. The Terriers have also participated in nine National Collegiate Athletic Association (NCAA) tournaments, their best showing came in 1978 when they made it to the Elite Eight. Since joining the NEC, the Terriers have made it to four NCAA tournaments and they have been one game away on three previous occasions ('95, '96 and '98).
 

Their last head coach, Tom Giovatto, joined the Terriers in 2007 and led the team to a 120–85–32 record. From 2013 to 2019, Giovatto's squads won two NEC regular season championship, four NEC tournament championships and participated in four NCAA Tournaments.

History

The Terriers played their home games at Brooklyn Bridge Park on Pier 5, which is also located in Brooklyn Heights. The field is located on the East River and has the Manhattan Skyline as a backdrop. The Terriers began hosting games on Pier 5 in 2013, they previously hosted home games at the Aviator Sports Complex located at Floyd Bennett Field, Brooklyn from 2007 to 2012. Prior to 2007, the Terriers played their home games at Belson Stadium, on the St. John's University campus in Queens. The Terriers first game at Brooklyn Bridge Park Pier 5 was against the St. Peter's University Peacocks on September 13, 2013, and resulted in a 3–1 victory for the home team.

Carlo Tramontozzi era (1968–1988)
The St. Francis Terriers men's soccer team was founded in 1968 by Carlo Tramontozzi with the help of Brother Roger Nagle and then athletic director Daniel Lynch. Tramontozzi was a recent graduate of Long Island University where he had helped lead the Blackbirds men's soccer team to the NCAA tournament (1965 and 1966) and garnered various national and regional awards as a player. As the head coach of the Terriers, Tramontozzi led them to a 190–116–30 record and to 5 NCAA tournament appearances over 21 seasons. The most successful team in program history was the 1978 Terriers squad that was ranked sixth nationally and made it to the quarterfinals in the NCAA tournament. His 1981 squad was also nationally ranked in the top 20. The 1985 season marked the beginning of conference play as the Terriers joined the Northeast Conference.

Sam Carrington era (1989–2001)

Carrington is an alumnus and played on Carlo Tramontozzi's 1982 NCAA Tournament qualifying team. He coached the Terriers for 13 seasons and led them to a 127–106–16 overall record and 62–37–7 in conference play. During his tenure the Terriers won 3 regular season championships and 4 conference tournament championships.

Tom Giovatto era (2007–2023)
Current head coach, Tom Giovatto, joined the Terriers in 2007 and has led the team to an 120–85–32 record. During his tenure as head coach, the Terriers have won 2 NEC regular season championships, 4 NEC tournament championships and have appeared in 4 NCAA Tournaments.
 
In his first six years at the helm, Giovatto had three winning seasons and three losing seasons. He failed to reach the NEC Tournament in 5 of those first 6 years. Then Giovatto proceeded to lead the Terriers to four NEC tournament championships in five years, from 2013 to 2017. The Terriers also participated in 4 NCAA tournaments, receiving the NEC's automatic bid for the conference tournament champion. The 2015 team went unbeaten in their first 9 games and were ranked 22nd Nationally by the NSCAA Top 25 Coaches Poll for the first time in the Tom Giovatto era. Giovatto has won two NEC Coach of the Year awards, first in 2016 and again in 2017- they coincide with the Terriers winning conference regular season championships those years. Also during this time, the Terriers have placed four players in professional leagues: Vincent Bezecourt (New York Red Bulls), Salvatore Barone (New York Cosmos), Dominick Falanga (New York Cosmos), and Leo Folla (Chattanooga Red Wolves SC).

After the 2017 season, Giovatto has had to rebuild his team due to losing high impact players to graduation. In 2018 and 2019, the Terriers failed to qualify for the NEC Tournament.

Seasons

Players

2019 roster
As of May 3, 2021.

   

  

    

    

 

  

          

 

 

Captains in bold

Coaching staff

 (2007–present)
 (2015–present) 
 (2019–present)

Terriers in professional leagues
 Leo Folla '17, signed with the Chattanooga Red Wolves SC of USL League One.  
 Dominick Falanga '17, signed with the New York Cosmos of the North American Soccer League.
 Salvatore Barone '17, signed with the New York Cosmos of the North American Soccer League.
 Vincent Bezecourt '16, signed with the New York Red Bulls of the Major League Soccer.
 Javier Gonzalez '09, former player with Club Deportivo Ñublense of Chile's Primera Division
 Joseph Afful '02, playing for Brooklyn Knights of the USL Premier Development League.
 Mersim Beskovic, former professional player
 Germain Iglesias, former professional player.

NCAA tournament results

The Terriers have appeared in 10 NCAA Division I Men's Soccer Championships and in 3 play-ins. Their NCAA Division I Men's Soccer Championship record is 4–10, while their Play-In record is 0–3 and does not count towards the tally. Their best finish was in 1978, when they reached the Elight Eight.

Coaching history

Terrier records

Record vs. NEC opponents

Conference rivalry
The fiercest rival of the Terriers are the Long Island University Blackbirds. Starting in 2013, the winner of the annual Battle of Brooklyn match is awarded the Ramirez/Tramontozzi trophy. The Trophy recognizes former coaches Arnie Ramirez and Carlos Tramontozzi, from LIU and St. Francis respectively. Both coaches were life-long friends and greatly influenced their respective programs. St. Francis Brooklyn captured the inaugural trophy on LIU's field on November 10, 2013, behind a 4–0 performance. The formal Battle of Brooklyn ended after the 2018 season, when LIU Brooklyn merged with LIU Post to form LIU and host their games on Long Island, rather than Brooklyn. Their rivalry continues, but for soccer matches the Battle of Brooklyn moniker is no longer used.

Accolades

NCAA Division I men's soccer First-Team All-Americans
 Dragan Radovich, 1976, 1977, 1978
 Clyde O'Garro, 1979

NCAA Division I men's soccer Second-Team All-Americans
Miro Urlic, 1979
Duke Shamo, 1998

NCAA Division I men's soccer Third-Team All-Americans
Kevin Correa, 2013
Vincent Bezecourt, 2015
Faouzi Taieb, 2017 (College Soccer News- Third team All-American)

NCAA Division I men's soccer Honorable Mention
Philip Laspisa, 1974
Gregory Kourtesis, 1976
Flavio Vozila, 1976
Gaetano Messina, 1978
Philip Klah, 1979

NEC men's soccer

References

External links
 

 
1968 establishments in New York City